National Convention Party may refer to:
National Convention Party (Gambia), a political party in Gambia
National Convention Party (Ghana), a political party in Ghana
National Convention Party (Mozambique), a political party in Mozambique
 National Convention Party (Malaysia), see Parti Perhimpunan Kebangsaan, a political party in Malaysia